Bogovinje Lake is situated in the Bogovinje municipality in the western part of the Republic of North Macedonia. It is one of 39 lakes on Šar mountains and like others boosts tourism in the local area.

References

Bogovinje
Bogovinje Municipality